The 2020–21 ADO Den Haag season was the club's 116th season in existence and the 13th consecutive season in the top flight of Dutch football. In addition to the domestic league, ADO Den Haag participated in this season's edition of the KNVB Cup. The season covered the period from 1 July 2020 to 30 June 2021.

Players

First-team squad

Out on loan

Pre-season and friendlies

Competitions

Overview

Eredivisie

League table

Results summary

Results by round

Matches
The league fixtures were announced on 24 July 2020.

KNVB Cup

References

External links

ADO Den Haag seasons
ADO Den Haag